Schicksale – und plötzlich ist alles anders (Fates - and suddenly everything is different) is a German television series.

See also
List of German television series

External links
 

2010 German television series debuts
German-language television shows
Sat.1 original programming